Patrick E. Hobbs (born March 29, 1960) is an American attorney, administrator, and professor.

Hobbs was born March 29, 1960 in Orange, New Jersey. He received a B.S. magna cum laude from Seton Hall University in 1982, a J.D. from the University of North Carolina at Chapel Hill in 1985 and an L.L.M. from New York University in 1988.

Hobbs was named the dean of the Seton Hall University School of Law in 1999. He joined the Law School faculty in 1990 and served as associate dean of finance from 1996 to 1999. He is an elected fellow of the American Bar Association and is a former co-chair of the American Bar Association Development Committee.

In 2004, Hobbs served as Chair of the Newark, New Jersey Mayor's Blue Ribbon Commission on the Downtown Core Redevelopment, which led the way for the construction of the Prudential Center entertainment arena. From 2009 to 2011, Hobbs served as interim leader of Seton Hall University's Athletics Department. From 2004 to 2014 Hobbs, served on the New Jersey State Commission of Investigation; he chaired the Commission beginning in 2010. He stepped down as Chair in 2014 after Governor Christopher Christie appointed him to a newly created role, Ombudsman for the Governor's office.

On November 29, 2015, Rutgers University President Robert L. Barchi named Hobbs as athletic director.

Sources
Lexis Nexis

1960 births
Living people
Deans of law schools in the United States
New York (state) lawyers
New York University School of Law alumni
Rutgers Scarlet Knights athletic directors
Seton Hall University alumni
Seton Hall University School of Law faculty
University of North Carolina School of Law alumni
People from Orange, New Jersey